Bob Ellison is an American consultant, screenwriter and producer. He worked as a consultant, screenwriter and producer for television programs including Dear John, The Mary Tyler Moore Show and Wings.

Ellison won two Primetime Emmys and five nominations for Outstanding Writing Variety or Music from 1971 to 1977.

Filmography 
Andy Richter Controls the Universe (TV series) 2002-2008
It's All Relative (TV series) (creative consultant - 10 episodes) 2003-2008
Becker (creative consultant - 61 episodes) 1999-2003
In-Laws (TV series) (creative consultant) 2002
The Trouble with Normal (TV series) (creative consultant - 4 episodes) 2000-2001
Caroline in the City (TV series) (executive consultant - 90 episodes, 1995-2000) 
Wings (TV series) (creative consultant - 89 episodes) 1993-1997
Fired Up (creative consultant) 1997
Pearl (TV series) (creative consultant - 2 episodes) 1996
Cheers (TV series) (executive script consultant - 166 episodes)1986-1993
Amen (TV series) (creative consultant - 6 episodes, 1986-1987) 
Angie (TV series) (executive consultant - 3 episodes) 1997Mary Tyler Moore (TV series) (executive story editor - 41 episodes, 1975-1977)Evening with Burt Bacharach'' (TV movie) (script) 1970

References

External links 

American male screenwriters
Primetime Emmy Award winners
Living people
Year of birth missing (living people)